Darwin Island is the largest of the Danger Islands, lying  east-southeast of the eastern tip of Joinville Island, off the northeast end of the Antarctic Peninsula. It was discovered in 1842 by a British expedition under James Clark Ross, and named by him for Charles Darwin, the noted naturalist.

See also 
 List of Antarctic and sub-Antarctic islands

References 

Islands of the Joinville Island group